Nicholas Potyn (died 1398) was an English politician.

Life
Potyn was the son of MP John Potyn of Rochester, Kent and his wife, Alice. He had one daughter.

Career
He was controller of customs for London from 1375 to 1377 and JP for Kent from 1394 until his death.

Potyn was MP for Kent in 1391, 1393 and January 1397, and was appointed Sheriff of Kent for 1398, dying in office.

Death
His heir was his daughter, Juliana.

References

Year of birth missing
1398 deaths
People from Rochester, Kent
14th-century births
English MPs 1391
High Sheriffs of Kent
English MPs 1393
English MPs January 1397